Nicorești is a commune in Galați County, Western Moldavia, Romania with a population of 6,099 people. It is composed of ten villages: Braniștea, Coasta Lupei, Dobrinești, Fântâni, Grozăvești, Ionășești, Mălureni, Nicorești, Piscu Corbului and Sârbi. It included two other villages until 2004, when they were split off to form Poiana Commune.

Natives
 Aurica Bărăscu

References

Communes in Galați County
Localities in Western Moldavia